Kizan Ryugen-ji (機山龍源寺), Ryugen-ji for short, is a Rinzai Zen Buddhist temple in Madison, Wisconsin. Ryugen-ji anchors the Madison Rinzai Zen Community, and is a branch temple of Korinji Rinzai Zen monastery. Meido Zentetsu Moore Roshi, the Korinji abbot, serves as Ryugen-ji's guiding teacher. Daiho Wagner Osho serves as the jushoku, resident priest, of Ryugen-ji.

Both Ryugen-ji and Korinji belong to a network of associated Zen practice groups called The Rinzai Zen Community (RZC).

See also
Buddhism in the United States
Glossary of Japanese Buddhism
Timeline of Zen Buddhism in the United States

Notes

External links
 Korinji Monastery

Asian-American culture in Wisconsin
Zen centers in the United States
Buddhist temples in Wisconsin
Religious buildings and structures in Madison, Wisconsin